The 2019 Home Hardware Canada Cup was held from November 27 – December 1 at Sobeys Arena in Leduc, Alberta. The tournament winners were the first qualifiers for the 2021 Canadian Olympic Curling Trials.

In the men's final, John Epping beat Kevin Koe to win his first Canada Cup. Koe was looking for his third title, having won the event in 2008 and 2015.

In the women's final, Rachel Homan defeated Tracy Fleury to win her second Canada Cup event, her first in 2015. It was Fleury's first Canada Cup playoff appearance with her previous best finish a 2-4 round robin record.

The total purse for the event was $265,000 with the winning teams to receive $40,000.

Men

Teams
Six teams qualified for the event on September 17. The top-ranked team on the CTRS standings as of November 11 that hasn't previously qualified will also qualify for the event.

Round-robin standings
Final round-robin standings

Round-robin results

All times are listed in Mountain Time (UTC−06:00)

Draw 1
Wednesday, November 27, 9:00 am

Draw 2
Wednesday, November 27, 2:00 pm

Draw 3
Wednesday, November 27, 7:00 pm

Draw 4
Thursday, November 28, 9:00 am

Draw 5
Thursday, November 28, 2:00 pm

Draw 6
Thursday, November 28, 7:00 pm

Draw 7
Friday, November 29, 9:00 am

Draw 8
Friday, November 29, 2:00 pm

Draw 9
Friday, November 29, 7:00 pm

Playoffs

Semifinal
Saturday, November 30, 2:00 pm

Final
Sunday, December 1, 5:00 pm

Women

Teams
Six teams qualified for the event on September 17. The top-ranked team on the CTRS standings as of November 11 that hasn't previously qualified will also qualify for the event.

Notes
  Cheryl Bernard is replacing Casey Scheidegger, who is due to give birth.
  Susan O'Connor threw lead stones for Team Scheidegger during Draw 4.

Round-robin standings
Final round-robin standings

Round-robin results

All times are listed in Mountain Time (UTC−06:00)

Draw 1
Wednesday, November 27, 9:00 am

Draw 2
Wednesday, November 27, 2:00 pm

Draw 3
Wednesday, November 27, 7:00 pm

Draw 4
Thursday, November 28, 9:00 am

Draw 5
Thursday, November 28, 2:00 pm

Draw 6
Thursday, November 28, 7:00 pm

Draw 7
Friday, November 29, 9:00 am

Draw 8
Friday, November 29, 2:00 pm

Draw 9
Friday, November 29, 7:00 pm

Playoffs

Semifinal
Saturday, November 30, 7:00 pm

Final
Sunday, December 1, 12:00 pm

References

External links

Canada Cup (curling)
Canada Cup
Canada Cup
Curling competitions in Alberta
Canada Cup
Canada Cup
Leduc, Alberta